Osjaków  is a village in Wieluń County, Łódź Voivodeship, in central Poland. It is the seat of the gmina (administrative district) called Gmina Osjaków.

The village has a population of 1,221.

References

 The Lost Jewish Community of Osjaków/Shakev

External links
Osjakow.info - website and forum of Osjakow

Villages in Wieluń County